The Republic of Tea is a privately owned American tea company based in Larkspur, California, that makes and sells more than 350 varieties of teas throughout North America. The Republic of Tea is known for packaging its loose teas and tea bags in tall, cylindrical tins. It was one of the first companies to offer varieties such as rooibos red tea, white tea, and tea seed oil to American consumers.

History
The company was founded in 1992 by Mel Ziegler, Patricia Ziegler, and Bill Rosenzweig. The Zieglers are also known for co-founding Banana Republic and ZoZa.com. In 1994, they sold the company to Ron Rubin, under whom The Republic of Tea has grown into a nationally recognized brand. Rubin's son Todd Rubin joined the company in 2007 and succeeded his father as president in 2015. Ron Rubin currently serves as The Republic of Tea's Executive Chairman and Minister of Tea. The Republic of Tea designates its employees as "ministers", its customers as "citizens", and its retail outlets as "embassies".

Practices

The Republic of Tea's products are distributed through speciality retailers including Whole Foods Market and Williams Sonoma. They do not intend to expand to mass market retailers such as Costco and Walmart. The company prides itself on maintaining slow but steady growth and operating without any debt.

The company supports sustainable agriculture. It sources several of its teas from biodynamic farms, a form of alternative agriculture similar to organic farming which treats soil fertility, plant growth, and livestock care as ecologically interrelated tasks.  It also produces Sonoma Teas, which are made from dried grape skins that would otherwise go to waste.

Both Ron and Todd Rubin have said that they are not interested in selling The Republic of Tea, despite a potential valuation as high as $125 million. Ron Rubin says he has always hoped his company would remain family-owned and private.

References

External links
 Official website
 Official distributor for Switzerland

Tea brands in the United States
Tea companies of the United States
Food and drink companies established in 1992
Companies based in California